James Pashley Burbeary (1822 – 21 July 1866) was an English first-class cricketer and solicitor.

Burbeary was born in the town of Tickhill, West Riding of Yorkshire in 1822. He played first-class cricket for Sheffield (aka Yorkshire) between 1846–52, making five appearances. He scored 42 runs in his five matches, in addition to taking a single wicket. He was by professional a solicitor. In December 1844, he was appointed a master extraordinary to the Court of Chancery by the Lord Chancellor, John Copley, 1st Baron Lyndhurst. Burbeary died at Sheffield on 21 July 1866 from bronchitis.

References

External links

1822 births
1866 deaths
People from Tickhill
English solicitors
English cricketers
Sheffield Cricket Club cricketers
Deaths from bronchitis
19th-century English lawyers